Sékou Koïta (born 28 November 1999) is a Malian professional footballer who plays as a forward for Austrian Bundesliga club Red Bull Salzburg and the Mali national team.

Club career
On 8 January 2018, Koïta moved to Wolfsberger AC on loan from Red Bull Salzburg. On 18 December 2019, Koïta extended his contract with Red Bull Salzburg until the summer of 2024.

On 18 February 2021, Koïta was suspended for three months of all club and international football activities by UEFA, following a doping investigation conducted by UEFA on which Koïta tested positive. Koita was prescribed medicine to combat altitude sickness that contained a substance on the banned list. In its verdict, UEFA ruled that in this case there was no intentional violation of doping rules, but the rules stipulate that every player is personally responsible for ensuring that no banned substances enter their body.

Career statistics

Club

International

Mali score listed first, score column indicates score after each Koïta goal.

Honours
Red Bull Salzburg
Austrian Bundesliga: 2019–20, 2020–21, 2021–22
Austrian Cup: 2019–20, 2020–21, 2021–22

Mali U-17
 FIFA U-17 World Cup runner-up: 2015

Mali U-20
 Africa U-20 Cup of Nations: 2019

Mali
 African Nations Championship runner-up: 2016

References

External links

 

1999 births
Living people
People from Kita, Mali
Association football forwards
Mali international footballers
Malian footballers
2014 African Nations Championship players
FC Liefering players
Wolfsberger AC players
FC Red Bull Salzburg players
2. Liga (Austria) players
Austrian Football Bundesliga players
Malian expatriate footballers
Malian expatriate sportspeople in Austria
Expatriate footballers in Austria
2019 Africa Cup of Nations players
Mali youth international footballers
Mali under-20 international footballers
Mali A' international footballers